Tereora College is a secondary school in Nikao, Rarotonga, Cook Islands. It is the oldest secondary school in the Cook Islands and the national college of the Cook Islands for Year 9–13 students.

The school was first established in 1895 by the London Missionary Society. It closed in 1911 by the New Zealand colonial administration.  It was re-opened in 1954 as a public school. The junior school offers the Cook Islands National Curriculum, while the senior school offers levels 1 - 3 of the New Zealand National Certificate of Educational Achievement.

The school buildings were built in the 1950s, but by 2015 were old and damp. In 2015 during the celebrations of the Cook Islands' 50th anniversary of self-government, New Zealand Prime Minister John Key announced an $11.7 million gift to redevelop the college. The redevelopment was to be designed by two former students who had studied architecture in New Zealand, and run in partnership with the Cook Islands investment Corporation. New Zealand Prime Minister Jacinda Ardern opened stage one of the redevelopment in March 2018.

A book on the early history of the school, Below the Bluff at Nikao, was published in 1995.

School Anau
The school groups students into four anau each named for a mountain on Rarotonga:

Students stay in the same anau class for their whole time at school.

Notable alumni
 Pa George Karika (born 1893), soldier and ariki
 Jim Marurai (born 1947), 8th Prime Minister of the Cook Islands
 Mike Tavioni (born 1947), artist
 Mark Brown, Deputy Prime Minister of the Cook Islands
 Teariki Heather (born 1959), politician and Deputy Prime Minister of the Cook Islands
 Margharet Matenga (born 1955/56), netball player, NZ Silver Ferns & Cook Is
 Ngamau Munokoa (born 1944), Cabinet Minister and the first woman Deputy Prime Minister
 Tina Browne, lawyer and Democratic party leader
 William (Smiley) Heather (born 1958), former Democratic Party leader
 Terepai Maoate Jnr (born 1961), MP

References

Schools in the Cook Islands
Avarua
Educational institutions established in 1895
1896 establishments in the British Empire